TRON (acronym for The Real-time Operating system Nucleus) is an open architecture real-time operating system kernel design. The project was started by Professor Dr. Ken Sakamura of the University of Tokyo in 1984. The project's goal is to create an ideal computer architecture and network, to provide for all of society's needs.

The Industrial TRON (ITRON) derivative was one of the world's most used operating systems in 2003, being present in billions of electronic devices such as mobile phones, appliances and even cars. Although mainly used by Japanese companies, it garnered interest worldwide. However, a dearth of quality English documentation was said to hinder its broader adoption.

The TRON project was integrated into T-Engine Forum in 2010. Today, it is supported by popular Secure Socket Layer (SSL) and Transport Layer Security (TLS) libraries such as wolfSSL.

Architecture
TRON does not specify the source code for the kernel, but instead is a "set of interfaces and design guidelines" for creating the kernel. This allows different companies to create their own versions of TRON, based on the specifications, which can be suited for different microprocessors.

While the specification of TRON is publicly available, implementations can be proprietary at the discretion of the implementer.

Sub-architectures
The TRON framework defines a complete architecture for the different computing units:
 ITRON (Industrial TRON): an architecture for real-time operating systems for embedded systems; this is the most popular use of the TRON architecture
 JTRON (Java TRON): a sub-project of ITRON to allow it to use the Java platform
 BTRON (Business TRON): for personal computers, workstations, PDAs, mainly as the human–machine interface in networks based on the TRON architecture
 CTRON (Central and Communications TRON): for mainframe computers, digital switching equipment
 MTRON (Macro TRON): for intercommunication between the different TRON components.
 STRON (Silicon TRON): hardware implementation of a real-time kernel.

Character encoding
 TRON (encoding), a way that TRON represents characters (as opposed to Unicode).

History
In 1984, the TRON project was officially launched. In 1985, NEC announced the first ITRON implementation based on the ITRON/86 specification. In 1986, the TRON Kyogikai (unincorporated TRON Association) was established, Hitachi announced its ITRON implementation based on the ITRON/68K specification, and the first TRON project symposium is held. In 1987, Fujitsu announced an ITRON implementation based on the ITRON/MMU specification, Mitsubishi Electric announced an ITRON implementation based on the ITRON/32 specification, and Hitachi introduced the Gmicro/200 32-bit microprocessor based on the TRON VLSI CPU specification.

In 1988, BTRON computer prototypes were being tested in various schools across Japan as the planned standardized computer for education. The project was organized by both the Ministry of International Trade and Industry and the Ministry of Education. However, Scott Callon of Stanford University writes that the project ran into some issues, such as BTRON being incompatible with existing DOS-based PCs and software. At the time NEC controlled 80-90% of the education market with DOS infrastructure, so adopting BTRON would have meant getting rid of all existing infrastructure. The existing incompatible PC software had also been personally written by school personnel, who opposed BTRON for this incompatibility with their earlier projects. There was also no software yet for the brand new computer. The project was additionally at least a year behind schedule and didn't perform better than earlier systems although that had been promised, which was possibly affected by the OS having been made by a firm that hadn't written one before. Because of these reasons, at the end of 1988 the Ministry of Education decided that it would not support the project unless BTRON was also made compatible with DOS. The Ministry of International Trade and Industry had hoped to avoid supporting NEC's domination of the PC market with DOS. In April 1989, as the negotiations for the possible however difficult BTRON integration with the NEC DOS architecture were still ongoing, the Office of the U.S. Trade Representative issued a preliminary report accusing BTRON which only functioned in Japan of being a trade barrier and asked the government not to make it standard in schools. TRON was included along with rice, semiconductors, and telecommunications equipment in an April 1989 list of items targeted by Super-301 (complete stop of import based on section 301 of the Omnibus Trade and Competitiveness Act of 1988). It was removed from the list after the USTR inspection team visited the TRON Association in May. In June the Japanese government expressed their regret at U.S. intervention but accepted this request not to make it standard in schools, thus ending the BTRON project. Callon opines that the project had nevertheless run into such difficulties that the U.S. intervention allowed the government to save face from cancelling the project. 

According to a report from The Wall Street Journal, in 1989 US officials feared that TRON could undercut American dominance in computers, but that in the end PC software and chips based on the TRON technology proved no match for Windows and Intel's processors as a global standard. In the 1980s Microsoft had at least once lobbied Washington about TRON until backing off, but Ken Sakamura himself believed Microsoft wasn't the impetus behind the Super-301 listing in 1989. Known for his off the cuff remarks, in 2004 governor of Tokyo Shintaro Ishihara mentioned in his column post concerning international trade policy that TRON was dropped because Carla Anderson Hills had threatened Ryutaro Hashimoto over it.

On 10 November 2017, TRON Forum, headquartered in Tokyo, Japan, which has been maintaining the TRON Project since 2010, has agreed with the Institute of Electrical and Electronics Engineers, headquartered in the US, to transfer ownership of TRON µT-Kernel 2.0, the most recent version of ITRON, for free. Stephen Dukes, Standards Committee, vice chair, IEEE Consumer Electronics Society said that IEEE will "accelerate standards development and streamline global distribution" through the agreement. By the agreement, TRON Forum has become an IP licensee of embedded TRON.

Administration
The TRON project was administered by the TRON Association. It was integrated into T-Engine Forum in 2010 and subsequently the TRON project activities have been taken over and continued by the forum. As of 10 November 2017, TRON µT-Kernel 2.0 is jointly managed by the IEEE and the Forum.

T-Engine
T-Engine Forum is a non-profit organization which develops open specifications for ITRON, T-Kernel, and ubiquitous ID architecture.
The chair of T-Engine Forum is Dr. Ken Sakamura. In July 2011, there were 266 members in T-Engine forum. Executive committee members includes top Japanese giants like Fujitsu, Hitachi, NTT DoCoMo, and Denso. A-level members who are involved in design and development of specifications for T-Engine and T-Kernel, or of Ubiquitous ID technology include companies such as eSOL, NEC and Yamaha Corporation. B-level members who are involved in development of product using T-Engine specification and T-Kernel include companies like ARM, Freescale, MIPS Technologies, Mitsubishi, Robert Bosch GmbH, Sony Corporation, Toshiba, and Xilinx. The supporting members and academic members involved with the forum include many universities such as University of Tokyo in Japan and Dalian Maritime University in China.

See also
ITRON
T-Kernel
RTOS

References

External links

TRON project
 
 
 
 TRON Web
 TRON specifications in English

BTRON
 B-Free in Japanese; Free BTRON OS project; archived
 EOTA in Japanese; Free BTRON "EOTA"
 BTRON introduction (pre-emptive multitasking feature mentioned amongst others)
 Seiko Brainpad TiPO Plus (URL translated to English / PC Watch article / PDA running BTRON / launched 1998 / 640x240 4-grayscale LCD, IrDA, PCMCIA Type II, 170 × 100 × 20 mm)
 Chokanji, aka Cho Kanji. From Personal Media Corporation (PMC) . A BTRON-specifications OS which runs on PC hardware. The PMC laptop "Cho Kanji Note W2B", announced on October 30, 2003, includes a Cho Kanji partition with a full suite of productivity applications, including a word processor, spreadsheet, drawing software, card database software, communications software, and an e-mailer and browser . Chokanji V screenshot with English language kit.
 Pictures of laptops running Chokanji:
R1 (from 2003–04; Pentium III M, 866 MHz)
T2 (from 2003–06; Pentium M, 900 MHz)
W2B (from 2003–10; Pentium M, 1.0 GHz)
Y2C (from 2004-03; Pentium M, 1.2 GHz)
R3EG (from 2004–11; Pentium M, 1.1 GHz)

MTRON 
 T-Engine Forum in English
 Ubiquitous ID Center in English; What is ubiquitous computing?

TOPPERS project 
 TOPPERS project in English

 
Real-time operating systems
Science and technology in Japan